Galitz is a Jewish surname indicating the origin of the family, of Galitzianer Jews.

The surname may refer to:

Sandra Galitz, birth name of Sandy Stewart (singer)
Robert Galitz,  founder of Dölling und Galitz Verlag, a German publishing house (:de:Dölling und Galitz Verlag)
Cathleen Galitz, American writer
Roie Galitz, an Israeli photographer and photography activist

See also

Jewish surnames